Edwin Mata (born 1 January 1970) is an Ecuadorian weightlifter. He competed in the men's bantamweight event at the 1988 Summer Olympics.

References

External links
 

1970 births
Living people
Ecuadorian male weightlifters
Olympic weightlifters of Ecuador
Weightlifters at the 1988 Summer Olympics
Place of birth missing (living people)